Blaque (internationally nicknamed Blaque Ivory) is the debut album by the American girl-group Blaque. 
It is an R&B and pop album, with hip hop and teen pop influences.
The album was certified Platinum by the Recording Industry Association of America (RIAA) on April 10, 2000. and has sold 1.5 million copies to date.

Critical reception 

AllMusic criticized the album as mediocre "generic urban soul" with "serviceable" production, sometimes hitting the mark but more often not. Entertainment Weekly gave the album a C− grade, criticizing the songs as derivative "mimicry" of other groups, saying that the girls "slide from genre to genre with all the care and discrimination of a bar mitzvah band."

Track listing

Notes
  denotes co-producer

Sample credits
 "Leny" contains excerpts from the composition "Bumpy's Lament", written and performed by Isaac Hayes.
 "Don't Go Looking for Love" contains excerpts from the composition "I Need Love", performed by LL Cool J.
 "Release Me" contains elements of "Shape of My Heart", performed by Sting.

Charts

Weekly charts

Year-end charts

Certifications

Release history

References

1999 debut albums
Blaque albums
Albums produced by R. Kelly
Albums produced by Ric Wake
Columbia Records albums
Albums produced by Cory Rooney